Mullapudi Venkata Ramana (28 June 1931 – 24 February 2011) was an Indian writer known for his work in Telugu language. Noted for his humorous and metaphorical style of writing, Mullapudi received Raghupathi Venkaiah Award from the Government of Andhra Pradesh in 1986 for his contributions to Telugu cinema and he also won six Nandi Awards.

Mullapudi is noted for his association with Bapu, who both worked together as Bapu–Ramana. The director–writer duo went onto make many successful films such as Bangaru Pichika (1968), Andala Ramudu (1973), Sampoorna Ramayanam (1973), Mutyala Muggu (1975), Pelli Pustakam (1993), Mister Pellam (1995), and Radha Gopalam (2005). He is also an essayist and cartoonist who is known for creating Budugu, a character considered as a corner stone for Telugu children's literature.

Early life 
Mullapudi Venkata Ramana was born in middle-class traditional family and his childhood mostly spent in a tiny village called Dowleswaram near Rajahmundry, Andhra Pradesh. Mullapudi had one elder sister and a younger brother. It was a happy family with no troubles until his father expired when Mullapudi was 9 years old. This turned their status upside down and they shifted to Chennai (called Madras in those days) for better opportunities. Mullapudi's mother Mrs. Adilakshmi took all the pains to raise the family in such situation. Mullapudi's education and career happened in Madras. During his study days, he had shown penchant for literature in Telugu and inclination in writing up short, effective storylines.

During the same period, he got a good friend in 'Bapu'. Their friendship was unconditional and mutually expending talents as Mullapudi is good at write-ups whereas Bapu is good at painting and caricature drawing. Soon they excelled in their talents and gave some of the most admirable Telugu films later in their life.

Katha Ramaneeyam' Part-1 having around 40 stories off 8 chapters each of them representing one of Navarasams (Nine emotions each human has). Some of them were made Films later viz. Seetha Kalyanam, Bhogimanta, Swayamvaram etc..

Katha Ramaneeyam' Part-2 having about 45 stories some of which representing Indian middle-class' tryst with life in hilarious way. While others pointing out the superstitions in our society, treatment of underprivileged in society which are definitely thought provoking.

Runanandalahiri is representation of average Indians, leading life in the times of inflation, joblessness, less privileged society and their tryst with their lives' problems. Mullapudi himself suffered such upsets in his life and even frank enough that some characters inspired from his own sufferings but dealt with in a humorous way.

Career
After completing SSLC in Madras, Mullapudi had to do many odd jobs before starting as a reporter for then-popular newspaper Andhra Patrika in 1953. Here he got the opportunity to interact with eminent writers of Telugu literature like Nanduri Ramamohana Rao, Pilaka Ganapati Sastri, Surampudi Seetaram etc. who were working for the same newspaper.

Sri. Mullapudi was first working for the "Daily" section of the newspaper and then shifted to "Weekly" section. While working here, his stories for children in the name of 'Budugu' (lil kid) were published and became very popular. He authored these stories to present the views of the little kids off their elders in the family. These stories are humorous, informative, knowledgeable to children and at the same time helping the elderly to know the thought process of their kids. Later, these stories were published in the form of a book, which was well received.

While writing for the "Cinema Page" section in the paper, Mullapudi's short and crisp writing helped him to gain popularity for his film reviews. That was the same time when he got introduced to film industry and befriended the famous stars of film fraternity. He got introduced to some great directors of those times, Adurthi SubbaRao and Dundi, who encouraged him to work for films. RakthaSambandam was his first break as a writer; since then he never lagged in his progress as story, screenplay, dialogue writer.

Films

Mullapudi's writing talent highlighted with his movie reviews and stories he wrote for films. Some of the initial films for story, screenplay dialogue Velugu needalu, Kanney manasulu were runaway hits, that has kept Mullapudi in good stead. Mooga manasulu, Bharya Bharthalu, Velugu Needalu and Teney manasulu have firmly established him as story writer. Some of these films had ANR (Akkineni NageswarRao) in the lead and their association brought their talent to the fore.

Soon, he became sought after film story writer and gave up his journalist job at Andhra Patrika. He partnered with his childhood friend Bapu and co-produced their first film Sakshi featuring actor Krishna which got accolades for its storyline and direction.

Bhakta Kannappa (great disciple of 'Lord Siva') with actor Krishnam Raju, who was till then doing villain roles, was a huge hit and gave him stardom. However, the milestone in his career is Sampurna Ramayanam (Ramayan epic) which featured Shoban Babu as Lord Rama turned out to be a major hit and is a masterpiece of Telugu films which is the best representation of the epic 'Ramayana' till today. The music of this film is ever popular and is played in festivals and functions.

Association with Bapu

Mullapudi's association with Bapu has a 60-year career plan. They first met in 1942 in P.S. High School, Madras where they studied V and VI level and then continued schooling at Kesari High School. Mullapudi's first short story "Amma Maata Vinakapothe" was published in 1945 in Bala, a children's magazine published by Radio Annayya (Nyayapathi Raghava Rao). He was 14 then. Bapu illustrated the story. His paintings were liked and that was the beginning of their long-standing association.

While Bapu achieved much of his fame sticking to a subtle style of artistic elegance, Mullapudi announced his entry through a bunch of talkative characters, who try to make no sense out of the sensible world around them, because of their askew point of view. Beginning as an illustrator-story writer team and then turning into a film-director-writer duo, they have contributed immensely to the enrichment of Telugu cultural ethos through literature and cinema

Mullapudi provided an able foil, providing script/dialogue that suited Bapu's visuals and this celebrated friendship and professional association made some very meaningful social films that were decent hits like Radha Kalyanam, Vamsa Vruksham, Pelli Pustakam, Mr. Pellam, Sundarakanda, and Radhaagopalam.

MuthyalaMuggu is one of the path-breaking films of yesteryear as the characters and story are even relevant today. This film launched Ravu Gopalarao in a negative role who soon became most sought-after actor in negative roles for next 20 years. The dialogues by Mullapudi were a runaway hit with all generations alike and popular even now.

Mullapudi translated the Thiruppavai written by the Tamil Vaishnavite saint Andal into Telugu as Melupalukula Melukolupu. This translation used Bapu's illustrations for each translated verse.

Television

During the years 1985–90, Mullapudi and Bapu made videos for school subjects for children on television. At the behest of then the chief minister of Andhra Pradesh Dr. N.T RamaRao, Bapu-Ramana made these education videos which were aired by Doordarshan in Telugu were very popular. The same were later dubbed and aired by National Doordarshan. A.R. Rahaman, the present day music maestro, was then an upcoming drummer, providing background music for few of these videos.

In this millennium, the magic of the Bapu-Ramana combination provided their expertise for the mega mythology serial Bhagavatham on ETV. Etv Sri Bhagavatam serial cast : Arun Govil as Dasavatara and Maha Vishnu, Sunil Kumar Sharma as Rama and Krishna, Gargi Roy Chaudhury as Sita and Rukhmini, Sharmilee Raj as SatyaBhama and Bhudevi, Bhavana as Jambavati, Sana as Yashodha, AVS as Narada, etc.,. It was well received by audience and firmly scaled up TRPs for the channel. Also directed Sri Venkateswara Vaibhavam for SVBC-TTD Channel by Bapu Ramana with SaiKiran, Mounica, Ashmita.

Autobiography

Kothi Kommachi, Inkothi Kommachi and Mukkothi Kommachi are Mullapudi's three-volume autobiography in books and audio forms. Just like the titles, the story keep hopping timelines and incidents. To put it in Mullapudi's own words, "it is like a monkey hopping from one branch to another branch."

Awards

Though Mullapudis' career has many faces – journalist, story teller, film critic, film story writer, dialogue writer and a popular film personality who represented a genre that produced the finest work in film arts, literature, journalism – many are dissatisfied that he hasn't been nominated for Padma awards, instituted by Government of India. His humble background and disinclination to associate with any political party could have been the reason for this.

However, he received endless appreciation of the Telugu people for his excellent work and has made a respectable place in their hearts. He is one of those who kept the flag of Telugu pride flying high.

 He was felicitated with Raghupathi Venkaiah Award for excellence in Films in 1986 instituted by the state of A.P.
 Received Honorary Doctorate awarded by Sri Venkateswara University, Tirupati.
 He was awarded the Raja-Lakshmi Literary Award for 1995 from Sri Raja-Lakshmi Foundation, Chennai.

Nandi Awards
 Second Best Story Writer – Poola Rangadu (1967) 
 Best Story Writer – Kathanayakudu (1969) 
 Second Best Story Writer – Andala Ramudu (1973)
 Best Dialogue Writer – Pelli Pusthakam (1991)
 Second Best Feature Film – Silver – Pelli Pusthakam (1991)
 Second Best Story Writer – Mister Pellam (1993)

Death
Mullapudi died of old-age related illness in Chennai on 24 February 2011. At the time of the death, he just completed the work for another mythological film Sri RamaRajyam.

Filmography
This is partial list of his films. Kindly help expanding it.

See also 
 Raghupathi Venkaiah Award

References

External links
 
 Bapu Ramana
 
 Idlebrain Article
 Kothi Kommachi

1931 births
2011 deaths
Telugu-language lyricists
Telugu writers
Telugu screenwriters
People from East Godavari district
Indian male screenwriters
Screenwriters from Andhra Pradesh
20th-century Indian dramatists and playwrights
20th-century Indian male writers